Aesculus sylvatica, the painted buckeye, is a species of shrub. The flowers are yellow and occasionally have red also. The species have dry fruit and brown, scaly bark. The species is commonly found in forests and along stream banks. The shrub is poisonous, as are its seeds.

References

Shrubs
sylvatica
Flora of Alabama
Trees of the United States